Anthony Jerrod Harris (born January 25, 1973) is a former professional American football player who played linebacker for four seasons for the Miami Dolphins.

References

1973 births
Living people
People from Fort Pierce, Florida
Players of American football from Florida
American football linebackers
Auburn Tigers football players
Miami Dolphins players